Choe Yeongmi (born September 25, 1961) is a South Korean poet and novelist and one of the figureheads of the MeToo movement in Korea, most widely recognized for her poetry collection At Thirty, the Party Is Over (1994).

Life
Born in Seoul, South Korea in 1961, Choe Yeongmi studied Western history (BA) at Seoul National University and art history (MA) at Hongik University. Faced with the military dictatorship, she participated in anti-government protests during college days. In 1981 she participated in a student protest demanding for democracy, and was detained for ten days and suspended from university for a year as a result. Choe was one of a secretive group of dissidents who translated Karl Marx's Kapital into Korean after the Korean War; this translation was published under a single pseudonym in 1987, and led to the arrest of the president of Yiron Kwa Silcheon Books. Following the decline of communism in the late 1980s and subsequent political changes at home and abroad, however, her political perspective changed to be a more inclusive worldview, which was reflected in her poetry. After she graduated, Choe joined an underground organisation called the Constituent Assembly Group, established to fight against the autocracy.

Career
Choe Yeongmi's literary career began in 1992 when she published eight poems, including "In Sokcho", in the winter issue of the magazine Creation and Criticism (창작과 비평). Two years later, she published her first poetry collection, At Thirty, the Party Is Over (1994), which was immediately controversial and immensely popular, with record sales of over half a million copies in its first year of publication alone. The book, which combined satire of society and culture with lyrical descriptions of everyday life in the 1980s and 90s in Korea, has since been reissued in 52 printings, with a revised 21st anniversary edition most recently published in 2015. She has published five more collections of poetry, Treading on the Pedals of Dreams (1998), To the Pigs (2005), Life That Has Yet To Arrive (2009), Things Already Hot (2013), and What Will Not Come Again (2019).

In 2006 Choe received the Isu Literary Award for To the Pigs (2005). In 2011 she was appointed as an honorary ambassador for the Korean National Assembly Library. Things Already Hot (2013) was selected as the Book Culture Foundation's Literary Book of Excellence in 2013. Choe's poem "At Sun-un Temple" was set to music and has been performed by various musicians. She gained national recognition with the publication of her poem "Monster" in 2017.

"Monster" and #MeToo movement
Choe Yeongmi is considered the founder of the MeToo movement in Korea. In 2017 she was contacted by a magazine editor asking her to submit a poem about feminism; Choe's resulting poem, "Monster", described her experiences being sexually harassed by a well-respected older male poet described only as "En." It was quickly revealed that the perpetrator in question was the highly revered Korean poet Ko Un, leading to a national outcry and reigniting the conversation around sexual harassment in literary spaces. Choe was honored with the Seoul Gender Equality Award in 2018 as a result of her speaking up about her experiences, described as a "brave account of the poet’s experience of sexual harassment".

In 2018 Ko Un sued Choe Yeongmi for defamation, but lost the case, with the Seoul Central District Court ruling in favor of Choe in 2019 and describing her allegations as "credible" and her testimony as "consistent and specific", and saying there was "little reason to doubt the veracity of her claims". Ko appealed to the Seoul High Court, but also lost the appeal, with the damages suit he had filed against Choe being settled in her favor. Multiple other women in the Korean literary scene have since spoken up about their own experiences with Ko Un's predatory behavior, which Choe Yeongmi described as an "open secret".

Works in Korean

Poetry collections
 At Thirty, the Party Is Over (1994)
 Treading on the Pedals of Dreams (1998)
 To the Pigs (2005)
 Life That Has Yet To Arrive (2009)
 Things Already Hot (2013)
 What Will Not Come Again (2019)

Novels
 Scars and Patterns (2005)
 The Garden of Bronze (2014)

Essay collections
 Melancholy of the Ages: Choe Yeongmi's European Diary

Translations
 "Francis Bacon in Conversation with Michel Archimbaud" (in The Cruel Hand of a Painter: Conversations with Francis Bacon) (1998)
 D'Aulaires' Book of Greek Myths (1999)

Works in English
 in Three Poets of Modern Korea: Yi Sang, Hahm Dong-Seon and Choi Young-Mi (trans. James Kimbrell and Yu Jung-yul, 2002, Sarabande Books), shortlisted for the 2004 ALTA Prize
 in Against Healing: Nine Korean Poets (ed. Emily Jungmin Yoon, 2019, Tilted Axis Press)

Reception
Several of Choe Yeongmi's poems have been included in high school textbooks, such as "In the Subway, II", in Changbi Publishers' 2012 literature textbook; "Melancholy of the Ages - Cologne", in Hakyeon Publishing's 2012 essay writing textbook; and "At Seon-un Temple", in Jihak Publishing's 2014 literature textbook.

Many of her poems have been adapted into music. The album "Love Alone - Artpop & Classic" (1998), written by Lee Gunyong, director of the Seoul Metropolitan Opera, and sung by Jeon Kyungok, featured four songs with lyrics from Choe Yeongmi's poems: "At Seon-un Temple", "Love Song for Adonis", "Sad Café Song", and "First Snow on Bukhansan". "At Seon-un Temple" was also rearranged by Kim Daesung to be included in his and Kang Kwonsoon's 2007 compilation, "First Feeling"; the poem was also performed by An Chihwan on his 2010 album "Today Is Good".

Personal life
Choe Yeongmi taught creative writing and poetry at Inha University in Incheon and Kangwon National University in Gangwon-do.

Several of Choe's essays about life, travel, and art have been published, including the collection Melancholy of the Ages: Choe Yeongmi's European Diary, "To You Who Will Peek into My Diary by Chance", and "Getting Lost Is a Real Trip". Choe is also a fan of football, and has published multiple essays about the sport, including an article about football in Korea in Die Tageszeitung'''s special issue in May 2006 for the 2006 FIFA World Cup, and "Ball Waits for No One" in 2011. She also served as a board member of the Korea Football Association's Football Love Sharing Foundation from 2012 to 2013.

In 2019 Choe established her own publishing house, Imi Books, through which she published her collection What Will Not Come Again''.

References

South Korean women poets
1961 births
Living people
20th-century South Korean poets
21st-century South Korean poets
People from Seoul
Date of birth missing (living people)
20th-century South Korean women writers
21st-century South Korean women writers